"Dry Town (Theme of Zero)/Shadow Behind" is the twelfth single by Japanese rock duo Love Psychedelico. It was released on May 19, 2010 as their first double A-side and first re-cut single.

Background 
"Dry Town (Theme of Zero)" is a newly arranged version of the song "Dry Town" from their second album Love Psychedelico Orchestra while "Shadow Behind" is the same version as included in Love Psychedelico's fifth studio album Abbot Kinney, released four months prior to the single. The two songs were chosen as the main and opening themes for the Aya Ueto-led police procedural drama Zettai Reido, respectively. Love Psychedelico's involvement with Zettai Reido marks their first drama tie-in in over six years. "Shadow Behind" currently still serves as the opening theme for the drama's second season.

Track listing

Charts

References

External links 

2010 singles
Japanese television drama theme songs
2010 songs